Canada–Ethiopia relations are foreign relations between Canada and Ethiopia. Both countries established diplomatic relations in 1956. Canada opened an embassy in Addis Ababa in 1957; although Ethiopia opened an embassy in Ottawa in 1962, it was closed the next year due to financial constraints and not re-opened until 1989. In 2021, Ethiopia closed its embassy in Ottawa again due to reshuffling and reorganization. In 2022, Ethiopia reopened its embassy in Ottawa.

Visits
The Canadian Prime Minister, Jean Chrétien made a visit to Ethiopia in 2002. The Vice Minister of the Ministry of Transport and Communication Ayenew Bitewilign visited Canada in 1995, while the President of the Ethiopian Supreme Court Kemal Bedri made a formal visit to that country in 2001.

Canadian aid
Ethiopia was one of 18 countries, in addition to the West Bank and Caribbean nations, which the Canadian government announced would be preferred in receiving foreign aid in 2009, down from 25 previous years.  This was down in hope of focussing resources in order to make a larger impact in these countries.

Canada is a significant donor of foreign aid to Ethiopia. Canada's official development assistance in 2007 to Ethiopia totalled US$90.52 million, making it fourth in bilateral donors.

In 2001, Canada sent 450 peacekeepers to the border region as part of a UN force with a mandate to prepare for UN peacekeeping mission in the border region with Eritrea. The Canadian Minister of National Defence, Art Eggleton, visited these troops in Ethiopia that same year.

See also 
 Africa–Canada relations
 Foreign relations of Canada
 Foreign relations of Ethiopia

References

External links 
  Canadian Ministry of Foreign Affairs and International Trade about relations with Ethiopia
 Canadian International Development Agency webpage on Ethiopia 
  Canadian embassy in Addis Ababa
  Ethiopian embassy in Ottawa

 
Ethiopia 
Bilateral relations of Ethiopia